The Women's beach volleyball event at the 2004 Summer Olympics in Athens, Greece, was held at the Olympic Beach Volleyball Centre located at the Faliro Coastal Zone Olympic Complex.  The gold medal went to Kerri Walsh and Misty May who had a perfect record in the tournament, losing not a single set.
The reigning champions from the 2000 Olympics, Natalie Cook and Kerri Ann Pottharst, both had new partners for Athens and coincidentally met at the last sixteen stage where Cook's team took the honours. Adriana Behar and Shelda Bede repeated their 2000 Olympic result, taking silver.

Pool play

The 24 competing teams were split equally into six pools of four, and each team played each of the other teams in their pool a best of three set match (so that the number of pool matches, P, played by each team was 3).

The teams in each pool were ranked first through fourth based on the number of matches won, W. In the event of a two-way tie, the winning team in the head-to-head match finished ahead. In a three-team tie, the total number of points each team won and lost during  all matches involving only the three tied teams were added up, and the bottom-ranked team of the three was decided by the points for to points against ratio; the other two teams were then ranked according to the outcome of the head-to-head match. The top two teams from each pool and the four best third placed teams (based on: first, matches won; second (in the event of a tie), set ratio SF/SA; and third (if there is still a tie), points ratio PF/PA) progressed through to the round of sixteen (single elimination tournament).

Two points (Pts) were awarded for each match win (W) and one point was given for each loss (L).
In individual matches, all winners are shown in bold.
In group tables, advancing teams are highlighted.

Pool A

August 15

August 17

August 19

Pool B

August 15

August 17

August 19

Pool C

August 15

August 17

August 19

Pool D

August 14

August 16

August 18

Pool E

August 14

August 16

August 18

Pool F

August 14

August 16

August 18

Playoffs

Round of 16
August 20

August 21

Quarter-finals
August 22

Semi-finals
August 23

Bronze-medal match
August 24

Gold-medal match
August 24

Final ranking

See also
Volleyball at the Summer Olympics

References

FIVB Olympic beach volleyball competition regulations

External links
Results of the Olympic Tournament

Olympics
Beach
2004
2004 Olympics
Beach,Olympics
Beach Volleyball